Stone & Webster was an American engineering services company based in Stoughton, Massachusetts. It was founded as an electrical testing lab and consulting firm by electrical engineers Charles A. Stone and Edwin S. Webster in 1889. In the early 20th century, Stone & Webster was known for operating streetcar systems in many cities across the United States including Dallas, Houston and Seattle. 
The company grew to provide engineering, construction, environmental, and plant operation and maintenance services, and it has long been involved in power generation projects, starting with hydroelectric plants of the late 19th-century; and with most American nuclear power plants.

Stone & Webster was acquired and integrated as a division of The Shaw Group in 2000, and in 2012, the French engineering conglomerate Technip acquired Stone & Webster's energy and chemical business, and process technologies and associated oil and gas engineering capabilities from The Shaw Group. The CB&I acquisition of other assets of The Shaw Group, also in 2012, resulted in the formation of a nuclear power subsidiary, CB&I Stone Webster, which operated for about 4 years, being sold in January 2016 to Westinghouse Electric Company.

History

Founding through 1930s

Charles A. Stone and Edwin S. Webster first met in 1884 and became close friends while studying electrical engineering at the Massachusetts Institute of Technology. In 1890, only two years after graduating, they formed the Massachusetts Electrical Engineering Company. The name was changed to Stone & Webster in 1893. Their company was one of the earliest electrical engineering consulting firms in the United States.

Stone & Webster's first major project was the construction of a hydroelectric plant for the New England paper company in 1890. Stone & Webster not only had valuable insight into developing and managing utilities but they also had keen intuition for businesses to invest in. For instance, due to the panic of 1893, Stone & Webster were able to acquire the Nashville Electric Light and Power Co. for a few thousand dollars and later sold it for $500,000.

Throughout the next ten years, Stone & Webster acquired interest in large number of utilities while offering managerial, engineering and financial consulting to a number of independent utility firms. Even though Stone & Webster were not a holding company, their financial and managerial presence meant that they had considerable influence in policy decisions. They would often be paid in utility stock.

As of 1912, Stone and Webster served as general managers of the following utilities:
 The Lowell Electric Light Corporation
 Puget Sound Electric Railway
 Columbus Electric Company
 Galveston-Houston Electric Railway Co. 
 Cape Breton Electric Company, Ltd.
 El Paso Electric Company
 Jacksonville Traction Company
 Ponce Electric Company
 Paducah Traction and Light Company
 Puget Sound International Ry. & Power Co. 
 Pacific Northwest Traction Company
 Mississippi River Power Company
 Edison Elec. Illuminating Co. of Brockton
 Fort Worth Southern Traction Company
 Houghton County Electric Light Co
 Brockton and Plymouth St. Ry. Company
 Houghton County Traction Company
 Savannah Electric Company
 Columbus Power Company
 Dallas Electric Corporation
 Northern Texas Electric Company
 Blackstone Valley Gas and Electric Co. 
 The Electric Light and Power Company of Abington and Rockland
 Everett Railway, Light and Water Co. 
 Haverhill Gas Light Company
 The Blue Hill Street Railway Company
 Dallas Southern Traction Company
 Puget Sound Traction, Light & Power Co
 Tampa Electric Company
 Pensacola Electric Company
 Public Service Investment Company 
 Houston Electric Company
 Fall River Gas Works Company 
 Galveston Electric Company
 The Key West Electric Company
 Baton Rouge Electric Company
 Whatcom County Railway & Light Co. 
 Railway & Light Securities Company 
 Sierra Pacific Electric Company
 Tacoma Railway and Power Company
 Eastern Texas Electric Company
 Galveston-Houston Electric Company

Stone & Webster became involved in Washington State engineering projects—Washington's natural resources, and hydroelectric power, and resulting development opportunities brought companies like Stone & Webster to the state—beginning with Puget Sound area street railways. By 1900, they had controlled and merged eight small rail lines in Seattle; soon after, they also took over the street railway systems of Tacoma and Everett. By 1908, Stone & Webster listed thirty-one railway and lighting companies under its management including five located in Washington State: the Puget Sound Electric Railway, Puget Sound International Railway and Power Co., Puget Sound Power Co., The Seattle Electric Co., and Whatcom County Railway and Light Co.

Stone & Webster leadership was sensitive to the concerns of large utility holding companies and were careful to emphasize the complete independence of these utilities, but Edwin Webster believed that outside capital was crucial to develop the resources of Washington, and chided those who thought otherwise. In 1905, Stone & Webster bought out the power and lighting properties that were once owned by the Bellingham Bay Improvement Co., including the York Street Steam plant and the partially built Nooksack Falls Hydroelectric Power Plant.Stone & Webster took over construction operations and on September 21, 1906, Bellingham received power from the plant via a  transmission line. Despite the independence allowed its subsidiaries, J.D. Ross, superintendent of Seattle City Light issued a report critical of Stone & Webster's presence in Seattle, listing 49 companies under Stone & Webster's management at the time.

By 1912, the company, nationally, had divided itself into three specialized subsidiaries:
 Stone & Webster Engineering
 Stone & Webster Management Association
 Stone & Webster Investments

In 1927, Stone & Webster expanded the investments business, merging its securities subsidiaries with the investment banking firm of Blodget & Co. founded in 1886, to form Stone & Webster and Blodget, Inc.

1940s activities, including in nuclear power
Stone & Webster wartime were involved in the Manhattan Project, which designed and built the atomic bomb. Stone & Webster was involved in creating the facilities and laboratories for the Manhattan Project. Prior to its acquisition it was also part of the Maine Yankee decommissioning project. The company was selected in June 1942 by the first MED District Engineer, Colonel James C. Marshall, as the main subcontractor for the project.

In January, 1946, the name of the business, was changed to Stone and Webster Securities Corporation. Stone and Webster Securities was one of the 17 U.S. investment banking and securities firms named in the United States Department of Justice's antitrust investigation of Wall Street commonly known as the Investment Bankers Case. The Stone & Webster investment banking operations were eventually acquired by Kidder Peabody which already had overlapping ownership.

1950s and 1960s

Challenges in the 1970s–80s
The investment banking affiliate, Stone & Webster Securities, had attempted to grow by acquiring two smaller, regional brokerage houses in 1968: Hayden, Miller & Co., based in Cleveland, and Atlanta-based Wyatt, Neal & Waggoner. That increased the number of offices of the firm from nine to 28, but cultural and style differences between the parent company's traditional engineering management and retail brokerage management led to an exodus of key employees, and the Securities firm closed its doors in 1974.

1990s

2000s

The company collapsed in 2000 after a major bribery scandal. It had attempted to pay $147 million to a relative of Indonesian President Suharto to secure the largest contract in Stone & Webster's history. But the plan went bad, and the company fell along with it.

Subsequently, Stone & Webster filed for Chapter 11 bankruptcy protection in 2000 because of cash flow problems. It was bought at auction by the Shaw Group for US$150 million.

The Shaw Energy and Chemicals division integrated Stone & Webster branded technology. Shaw's E&C division attempted to compete with other more successful engineering contractors such as Bechtel, Foster Wheeler, Jacobs and Technip. Since the Shaw buyout, the Power group performed record business in engineering and construction of coal-fired power plants and power plant environmental control retrofits including FGD and SCR technology. Shaw's alliance with Westinghouse led to substantial Stone & Webster technology and engineering applications in the nuclear power industry. In 2008, ENR ranked the Stone & Webster subsidiary of The Shaw Group subsidiary as first in revenue for Power EPC, and fifth by Revenue in Process & Petrochemical EPC.

In 2012, Technip, a French engineering conglomerate, agreed to purchase most of the Energy and Chemical Division of Shaw Group

The remainder of The Shaw Group assets were ultimately purchased by Chicago Bridge & Iron Company, for about US$3 billion, completing the acquisition in February 2013. A subsidiary that was formed as a result, CB&I Stone Webster—a result of Shaw Groups earlier acquisition of Stone & Webster during its bankruptcy—was again sold, in January 2016, to Westinghouse Electric Co., for US$ 229M.

See also
Birney Safety Car A standard streetcar designed by Stone & Webster engineer Charles O. Birney
Northern Texas Traction Company A subsidiary company

References

Archives and records
Stone & Webster records at Baker Library Special Collections, Harvard Business School.

External links
 Guide to MS018 Stone & Webster, Inc. Records finding aid at University of Texas El Paso regarding the El Paso Trolley system. Archived
 Stone & Webster Inc. — Company History at FundingUniverse.com
Stone & Webster, Inc - Stoughton, Massachusetts (MA) – Company Profile at Manta

Companies based in Massachusetts
Technology companies established in 1889
Companies that filed for Chapter 11 bankruptcy in 2000
Energy companies of the United States
Engineering companies of the United States
1889 establishments in Massachusetts
Manhattan Project
Construction and civil engineering companies established in 1889